Durgapur Women's College, established in 1980, is a women's college in Durgapur, Paschim Bardhaman district. It offers undergraduate courses in arts, sciences and commerce. It is affiliated to  Kazi Nazrul University.

Departments

Science
Botany

Chemistry
Physics
Mathematics
Computer Science
Electronics
Zoology
Geography
Psychology
Economics

Arts

Philosophy
English
History
Bengali
Political Science
Philosophy
Hindi
Sanskrit
Commerce

Accreditation
The college is recognized by the University Grants Commission (UGC). It has been accredited by NAAC with B++ Grade with a CGPA of 2.77.

See also

References

External links
Official website
Kazi Nazrul University
University Grants Commission
National Assessment and Accreditation Council

Colleges affiliated to Kazi Nazrul University
Academic institutions formerly affiliated with the University of Burdwan
Educational institutions established in 1980
Universities and colleges in Paschim Bardhaman district
Women's universities and colleges in West Bengal
1980 establishments in West Bengal
Education in Durgapur, West Bengal